is a Japanese musician, popular in the 1970s and 1980s.

Biography
Lewis was born to a Japanese mother and an American father. She also has one brother. Her many hits include the popular song "Roppongi Shinju", "Good Bye My Love" and many others which have been covered by other Asian artists. She semi-retired from show-business in the 1990s, suffering from chronic panic attacks, and settled down in Los Angeles. She released a few self-covers albums in the 2000s. She has been active as a creative director, consultant and designer. Works include interior designs (private homes to business offices, restaurants and shops), releasing a line of original  jewelry, creating original animation, logos and other projects. She has also been involved as the President, COO and marketing consultant for several software companies in the USA.

Personal life
Lewis was married to Japanese singer Masahiro Kuwana from 1980 to 1984. They have a son together, Myuji, who was born in 1981. Her son is also a singer in Japan.

Discography

Singles
"Shiroi Shuumatsu" (白い週末) (1971.2.25) Oricon Weekly Singles Chart Position: 77
"Wakarimasen" (わかりません) (1973.4.25) Oricon Weekly Singles Chart Position: 44
"Goodbye My Love" (グッド・バイ・マイ・ラブ) (1974.4.5) Oricon Weekly Singles Chart Position: 14
"Honeymoon in Hawaii" (ハネムーン・イン・ハワイ) (1974.8.25) Oricon Weekly Singles Chart Position: 66
"Four Season" (フォー・シーズン) (1974.11.25) Oricon Weekly Singles Chart Position: 96
"Amai Yokan" (甘い予感) (1977.8)  
"Onna wa Sore o Gamandekinai" (女はそれを我慢できない) (1978.5.5) Oricon Weekly Singles Chart Position: 12
"女にスジは通らない" (1978.9.5) Oricon Weekly Singles Chart Position: 43
"I'm a Lonely Lady" (アイム・ア・ロンリー・レディ) (1979.6.25) Oricon Weekly Singles Chart Position: 61
"Koi no Boogie Woogie Love Train" (恋のブギ・ウギ・トレイン) (1979.12.25) Oricon Weekly Singles Chart Position: 89
"Boogie Woogie Love Train" (1980.6.5) Oricon Weekly Singles Chart Position: 64
"Linda" (1980.8.5) Oricon Weekly Singles Chart Position: 33
"La Saison" (ラ・セゾン) (1982.6.5) Oricon Weekly Singles Chart Position: 3
"Luv-Ya" (1983.2.21) Oricon Weekly Singles Chart Position: 25
"Bara no Kiseki" (薔薇の奇蹟) (1983.5.1) Oricon Weekly Singles Chart Position: 96
"I Love You Yori Aishteru" (I Love You より愛してる) (1983.10.21) Oricon Weekly Singles Chart Position: 76
"Roppongi Shinju" (六本木心中) (1984.10.5) Oricon Weekly Singles Chart Position: 12
"Pink Diamond" (ピンクダイヤモンド) (1985.3.5) Oricon Weekly Singles Chart Position: 89
"Ah, Mujyou" (あゝ無情) (1986.4.21) Oricon Weekly Singles Chart Position: 21
"Tenshi yo Kokyou o miyo" (天使よ故郷を見よ) (1987.5.1) Oricon Weekly Singles Chart Position: 29
"Katana" (1988.4.21) Oricon Weekly Singles Chart Position: 39
"Bijinhakumei" (美人薄命) (1989.3.21)
"Woman" (1989.9.6) Oricon Weekly Singles Chart Position: 31
"Yokubou" (欲望) (1990.6.21) Oricon Weekly Singles Chart Position: 38
"Finish!!" (1990.10.3) Oricon Weekly Singles Chart Position: 55
"Yoru ni Kizutsuite" (夜に傷ついて) (1992.5.21) Oricon Weekly Singles Chart Position: 52
"Lovin’ You" (1992.11.21) Oricon Weekly Singles Chart Position: 97
"Ya! Ya!" (1993.7.21) Oricon Weekly Singles Chart Position: 57
"Midnight Sun" (1994.5.21) Oricon Weekly Singles Chart Position: 88
"I’m in Love" (1994.9.21) Oricon Weekly Singles Chart Position: 97
"Womanism Rhythm" (1995.9.21) Oricon Weekly Singles Chart Position: 74
"恋を眠らせて" (1996.8.21)
"Vendetta" (1997.11.21)
"Hyougara Pink" (豹柄とPink) (1998.2.21)
"Sennen Ai" (千年愛) (1999.2.3)

Albums
Ann Lewis Sings Ventures Hit (1972)
Goodbye My Love (1974)
Honeymoon In Hawaii (1974)
Koi no Omokage (1975)
Koi wo Utau (1976)
Rock n Roll Baby (1977)
Think! Pink! (1978
Pink Pussy Cat (1979)
LINDA (1980)
La Saison d'Amour (1982)
Heavy Moon (1983)
I Love You Yori Ashiteru (I Love You より愛してる) (1983)
Dri Yume X-T-C (Dri夢・X-T-C) (1984)
Romantic Violence (1984)
Yujo (遊女) (1986)
Joshin (1987)
Meiki (女息) (1988)
My Name Is Woman (1989)
Rude (1990)
K･Rock (1992)
Rockadelic (1993)
Piercer (1994)
La Adelita (1996) Oricon Weekly Album Chart Position: 91
Fetish (1998)

Best of albums
全曲集 (1985)
Womanism I (1991)
Womanism II (1991) Oricon Weekly Album Chart Position: 3
Womanism III (1991)
Womanism IV (1995) Oricon Weekly Album Chart Position: 25
Womanism Outtakes (1995) (packaged with Womanism I-IV set)
Womanism Best (2000)
Ann Lewis Best Selection (2005)
Womanism Complete Best (2006)
Cheek I (2007)
Cheek II (2007)
Cheek III (2007)

Cover albums
Girls Night Out (2003)
Me-Myself-Ann-I "Refreshed" (2004)
Rebirth Self-cover Best (2005)
Pink Christmas – Pukkalicious – Cheek IV (2007)

References

External links
 Profile and discography at Oricon charts site 
 Profile on Columbia Japan 

1956 births
Living people
Japanese women singers
Japanese women pop singers
Japanese women rock singers
Japanese people of American descent
Musicians from Kobe
Victor Entertainment artists